The Americas Zone was one of the three zones of the regional Davis Cup competition in 2001.

In the Americas Zone there were four different tiers, called groups, in which teams compete against each other to advance to the upper tier. Winners in Group II advanced to the Americas Zone Group I. Teams who lost their respective ties competed in the relegation play-offs, with winning teams remaining in Group II, whereas teams who lost their play-offs were relegated to the Americas Zone Group III in 2002.

Participating nations

Draw

 and  relegated to Group III in 2002.
 promoted to Group I in 2002.

First round

Uruguay vs. Colombia

Costa Rica vs. Netherlands Antilles

Guatemala vs. Dominican Republic

Paraguay vs. Venezuela

Second round

Uruguay vs. Netherlands Antilles

Guatemala vs. Venezuela

Relegation play-offs

Colombia vs. Costa Rica

Paraguay vs. Dominican Republic

Third round

Uruguay vs. Venezuela

References

External links
Davis Cup official website

Davis Cup Americas Zone
Americas Zone Group II